Alticorpus geoffreyi is a species of haplochromine cichlid which is endemic to Lake Malawi, where it is widely distributed and can be found at depths of , although it is most common below . The specific name honours the British carcinologist, ecologist and ichthyologist Geoffrey Fryer (b. 1927), who studied the fishes of Lake Malawi, especially the cichlids which occur in the rocky areas of the lake.

References

geoffreyi
Taxa named by Jos Snoeks
Taxa named by Rhoda Walapa
Fish described in 2004